Dongah (also Romanized as Dongāh and Dangah; also known as Dūngāh, Dungāi, and Dyungyan) is a village in Bakrabad Rural District, in the Central District of Varzaqan County, East Azerbaijan Province, Iran. At the 2006 census, its population was 23, in 6 families.

References 

Towns and villages in Varzaqan County